Schlitz is a small town in the Vogelsbergkreis in eastern Hesse, Germany.

Geography

Location
The town of Schlitz lies at the outlet of the small river Schlitz on the Fulda.

Neighbouring communities
Schlitz borders in the north on the communities of Breitenbach and Niederaula (both in Hersfeld-Rotenburg), in the east on the communities of Haunetal (Hersfeld-Rotenburg) and Burghaun and the town of Hünfeld (both in Fulda district), in the southeast on the city of Fulda (Fulda district), in the south on the communities of Großenlüder and Bad Salzschlirf (both in Fulda district), in the southwest on the community of Wartenberg, and in the west on the town of Lauterbach.

Constituent communities
Schlitz is divided into the following communities: Bernshausen, Fraurombach, Hartershausen, Hemmen, Hutzdorf, Nieder-Stoll, Ober-Wegfurth, Pfordt, Queck, Rimbach, Sandlofs, Schlitz, Üllershausen, Ützhausen, Unter-Schwarz, Unter-Wegfurth and Willofs.

History
The name Schlitz had its first documentary mention in 812. Schlitz is known throughout Hesse for the town's five castles and is also called the Romantische Burgenstadt Schlitz (the Romantic Castle Town of Schlitz).

One peculiarity about the town is its so-called Burgenring, or Castle Ring, with the town built on a hill with its accumulated castles, towers, lords' houses, the town church and many half-timbered houses presenting a well preserved, compact, historic Old Town. For the Castle Ring's splendour and the town's outstanding location, Schlitz was sometimes called in earlier times the "Hessian Rothenburg ob der Tauber"

The Lords of Schlitz had built up their mastery in an autonomous fief from the Fulda Abbey. As of 1404 they were calling themselves Schlitz von Görtz (in documents also Gurz or Görz). After the Reformation came in 1563, and as a result of the Thirty Years' War, however, they broke away from Fulda. In 1677, they became Imperial Barons and, in 1726, Imperial Counts. In 1806, the area passed to Hesse-Darmstadt.

Schlitz was granted town rights in the early 15th century.

Since 1951, the Fluß-Station Schlitz ("Schlitz River Station") has been in Schlitz. This working group from the Max Planck Institute for Limnology is researching the ecology of the tiny Breitenbach stream in the neighbouring Breitecke Nature Preserve. The Breitenbach, through many studies and publications,  is one of the world's best researched and documented streams. In 2006, this research station, with the current scientific leader's retirement, is to be closed by the Max Planck Society.

Politics

Local council
Elections were held in March 2016:

The council has 31 members:
CDU: 13
SPD: 10
BLS: 5
FDP: 3

Coat of arms
Schlitz's civic coat of arms might heraldically be described thus: In argent a fess sable, within, an inescutcheon, in argent bendlets sinister embattled three points each sable.

The oldest town seal dates only from the 17th century. The current arms were conferred in 1919. The embattled bendlets in the inescutcheon stand for the town's castles.

Twinned towns
  Bogyiszló

Economy

Transport
Schlitz can be reached by long-distance travel by Autobahn A 7 (Hünfeld/Schlitz interchange). Nearby lie the towns of Fulda and Lauterbach.

Public institutions

Educational institutions
Schlitz is home to the Hessische Akademie für musisch-kulturelle Bildung GmbH ("Hessian Academy for Artistic-Cultural Education, Limited"), the state music academy, at Hallenburg Castle.

Regular events
 Schlitzerländer Trachtenfest ("Schlitz-Land Costume Festival"), takes place in odd-numbered years on the second weekend in July.

Personalities

Sons and daughters of the town
Cyriacus Spangenberg (1528–1604), pastor in Schlitz for ten years after losing his position at Mansfeld.
Friedrich Wilhelm von Schlitz (1647–1728), privy councillor and President of the Chamber
Gudrun Pausewang (1928–2020), writer, who lived in town for many years
Florian Illies (1971– ), writer, who grew up in Schlitz who describes German rural life as an example of his hometown in his book  Ortsgespräch "'.
Georg Christian Dieffenbach (1822–1901), clergyman and poet
 Carl Wilhelm Kern (1874-1945), composer, pianist and music theorist, active in the USA
 Jost Trier (1894-1970), Old Germanist

In fiction
The fictional town of Schewenborn, where the plot of the 1983 novel The Last Children of Schewenborn'' takes place (depicting life in Germany in the aftermath of a nuclear war) is modeled on Schlitz, as specifically stated by the writer Gudrun Pausewang, herself an inhabitant of the town.

See also
Schlitz Christmas Candle

References

External links

 Official website
 Private Homepage zur Schlitzer Heimatgeschichte
 Geschichte der Reichsgrafschaft Schlitz
 Offizielle Seite zum Schlitzerländer Heimat- und Trachtenfest

1806 disestablishments
States and territories established in 1116
Towns in Hesse
Vogelsbergkreis
Grand Duchy of Hesse